American Fugitive: The Truth About Hassan is a film, directed by Jean-Daniel Lafond, about an exiled American political activist named Dawud Salahuddin (also known as David Belfield and Hassan Abdulrahman).  Belfield has confessed to assassinating a former Iranian diplomat, who supported the shah of Iran, Mohammad Reza Pahlavi, in 1980.

Belfield unexpectedly appeared playing an exiled American political activist in the 2001 film Kandahar.
Lafond then traveled to Iran to film the documentary about him.

References

External links

2006 films
Iranian documentary films
Canadian documentary films
Documentary films about Iran
2006 documentary films
Documentary films about crime
Quebec films
2000s Canadian films